Presidential elections were held in Honduras between 9 and 11 November 1883. The result was a victory for Luis Bográn.

Background
President Marco Aurelio Soto resigned from office on 10 March 1883. Although he claimed to be ill, it was considered likely that he was concerned by rumours that Guatemalan president Justo Rufino Barrios was supporting Soto's opponents. Although Soto's resignation was rejected, he was allowed to travel to the United States and Europe, and in May passed power to a Council of Ministers consisting of Bográn, Enrique Gutiérrez Lozano and Rafael Alvarado Manzano. He resigned from office again on 27 August.

Gutiérrez was the favourite to succeed Soto, but died on 11 September during the election campaign.

Results

Aftermath
Bográn was inaugurated as president on 30 November.

References

Honduras
1883 in Honduras
Presidential elections in Honduras
Election and referendum articles with incomplete results